Camira may refer to:
 Holden Camira car manufactured in Australia
 Camira, Queensland, a town in Australia
 Camira Fabrics, a global textile manufacturer in England
MV Camira, the last 'sixty-miler' operating on the run from Newcastle to Sydney, N.S.W., Australia